Major-General William Reginald Cox CB, DSO (13 June 1905 – 12 June 1988) was a senior British Army officer who commanded the 1st Battalion, Worcestershire Regiment in the Western European Campaign from June 1944 until Victory in Europe Day in May 1945. He later served as colonel of the King's Shropshire Light Infantry.

Military career
Educated at the Royal Military College, Sandhurst, Cox joined the British Army and was commissioned as a second lieutenant in the King's Shropshire Light Infantry on 29 January 1925.

After attending the Staff College, Camberley, he served in World War II, initially as a staff officer and then as Commanding Officer (CO) of the 11th Battalion, Worcestershire Regiment from July 1942 (reconstituted as the 1st Battalion, Worcestershire Regiment from January 1943) until September 1943. Towards the end of the war he commanded the 131st Infantry Brigade of the 7th Armoured Division, the 69th Infantry Brigade of the 50th (Northumbrian) Infantry Division and the 129th Infantry Brigade of the 43rd (Wessex) Infantry Division.

After the war he became brigadier on the general staff at Western Command in 1948, Deputy Director of Infantry in June 1953 and Chief of Staff at Southern Command in March 1954. He went on to be General Officer Commanding (GOC) Mid West District and 53rd (Welsh) Infantry Division in March 1955 and Director, Territorial Army, Cadets and Home Guard in February 1958. He retired in August 1960.

Cox became colonel of the King's Shropshire Light Infantry in November 1957. He died on 12 June 1988 at Salisbury.

References

|-

1905 births
1988 deaths
Graduates of the Staff College, Camberley
British Army brigadiers of World War II
Companions of the Order of the Bath
Companions of the Distinguished Service Order
King's Shropshire Light Infantry officers
Graduates of the Royal Military College, Sandhurst
People from Herefordshire
Military personnel from Herefordshire
British Army major generals